List table of the properties and districts — listed on the California Historical Landmarks — within Santa Barbara County, California. 

Note: Click the "Map of all coordinates" link to the right to view a Google map of all properties and districts with latitude and longitude coordinates in the table below.

Listings

|}

See also
List of California Historical Landmarks
National Register of Historic Places listings in Santa Barbara County, California
City of Santa Barbara Historic Landmarks

References

  

.
List of California Historical Landmarks
C01
C01
History of Southern California